Lonchophylla is a genus of bats in the family Phyllostomidae.

List of species
Genus Lonchophylla
Bokermann's nectar bat, Lonchophylla bokermanni
Cadena's long-tongued bat, Lonchophylla cadenai
Chocoan long-tongued bat, Lonchophylla chocoana
Dekeyser's nectar bat, Lonchophylla dekeyseri
Arched nectar bat, Lonchophylla fornicata
Handley's nectar bat, Lonchophylla handleyi
Western nectar bat, Lonchophylla hesperia
Unexpected nectar bat, Lonchophylla inexpectata
Goldman's nectar bat, Lonchophylla mordax
Orcés's long-tongued bat, Lonchophylla orcesi
Eastern Cordilleran nectar bat, Lonchophylla orienticollina
Patton's long-tongued bat, Lonchophylla pattoni
Peracchi's nectar bat, Lonchophylla peracchii
Orange nectar bat, Lonchophylla robusta
Thomas's nectar bat, Lonchophylla thomasi

References

 
Bat genera
Taxa named by Oldfield Thomas